The sixth season of So You Think You Can Dance, a Belgian-Dutch televised dance competition based on the American show by the same name, aired in late 2013 and concluded on December 1 with modern dancer Danny Boom as the winner.  The judge's panel for this seasons was composed, for the second year running, of Dan Karaty, Euvgenia Parakhina, Jan Kooijman and Ish Ait Hamou and the shows hosting duties fell again to Dennis Weening and An Lemmens, in their fifth consecutive year as co-presenters.  For this season, the "boot camp" portion of the finalist selection process was held in Seville, Spain.

Liveshows

Top 18

Boys

Girls

Elimination List

Performances

Liveshow 1 (October 13, 2013) 
 Group Choreography:Top 18: "Papaoutai" - Stromae (Hip-hop, Choreographer: Roy Julen)

Result Show 1
 Dance For Your Life solos :

Liveshow 2 (October 20, 2013) 

Result Show 2
 Group Choreography, Top 16: "Hopeless Wanderer" - Mumford & Sons (Modern, Choreographer:Roy Julen)
 Dance For Your Life solos:

 New Couple:
 Liam O'Callaghan & Kris Siek Erman

Liveshow 3 (October 27, 2013) 

Result Show 3
 Group Choreography: "Top 14 : "I Love It/All Night" - Icona Pop (Jazz, Choreographer:Roy Julen )
 Dance For Your Life solos:

 After the announcement of the week's eliminations, with Kris Siek Erman and Liam O'Callaghan eliminated, Johan Christensen voluntarily withdrew from the competition for undisclosed personal reasons allowing O'Callaghan to continue to the next week of competition.
 New Couple:
 Liam O'Callaghan & Rowan Hoppenbrouwers

Liveshow 4 (November 3, 2013) 

Result Show 4
 Group Choreography, Top 12: "La Valse D' amelie" - Yann Tiersen (Jazz,Choreographer :Roy Julen)
 Dance For Your Life solos :

Liveshow 5 (November 10, 2013) 

 'Result Show 5 '
 Group Choreography, Top 10: "Turn Me On" - David Guetta feat . Nicki Minaj (Latin, Choreographers: Koen Brouwers and Roemjana Rooster )
 Solos :

Liveshow 6 (November 17, 2013) 

Result Show 6
 Group Choreography, Top 8: "Holy Grail" - Justin Timberlake feat . Jay z ( Hip-hop/Modern, Choreographer: Roy Julen )
 Solos :

Liveshow 7 (November 24, 2013) 

 'Result Show 7 Group Choreography, Top 6: " Crystallize" - Lindsey Stirling (Modern, Choreographer: Roy Julen)
 Eliminated : Ellen Houck **
Miguel Pereira Carneiro **

 Finale (December 1, 2013) 
 Group Choreography : '"Top 18:"Just one last time ' - David Guetta feat Taped Rai ( Hip Hop'"Choreographer : Roy Julen )Result Show 8 Eliminated Giovanni Kemper **

 Solos :  Battle :  Runner -up Anneke Ghysens **
 Winner: '
Danny Boom **

External links 
 Belgian site of So You Think You Can Dance
 Dutch website of So You Think You Can Dance

So You Think You Can Dance (Belgian and Dutch TV series)
Belgian reality television series
2013 Belgian television seasons
2013 Dutch television seasons